The 2020–21 Biathlon World Cup – Individual Women started on 28 November 2020 in Kontiolahti and will finished on 16 February 2021 in Pokljuka.

Competition format
The individual race is the oldest biathlon event; the distance is skied over five laps. The biathlete shoots four times at any shooting lane, in the order of prone, standing, prone, standing, totalling 20 targets. Competitors' starts are staggered, normally by 30 seconds. The distance skied is usually 20 kilometres (12.4 mi) with a fixed penalty time of one minute per missed target that is added to the skiing time of the biathlete. In the "Short Individual" the distance is 15 kilometres (9.3 mi) with a penalty time of 45 seconds per missed target.

2019–20 Top 3 standings

Medal winners

Standings

References

Individual Women